Snooper may refer to:

 A device that transmits and receives audio content and allows one or more listeners to listen in on that content
 Snooper and Blabber, one of the sequences from The Quick Draw McGraw Show
 Republic SD-3 Snooper, a U.S. Army reconnaissance drone
 Packet sniffer
 Snooper, a strip from the British comic Buster